Vladimir Georgiyevich Belyayev (September 15, 1933 in Nalchik – January 23, 2001) was a Soviet football player.

Honours
 Soviet Top League winner: 1957, 1959, 1963.
 Soviet Cup winner: 1953.

International career
Belyayev made his debut for USSR on August 15, 1957 in a 1958 FIFA World Cup qualifier against Finland. He was selected for the World Cup final tournament squad, but did not play in any games there. He also played in a 1960 European Nations' Cup qualifier.

External links
  Profile

1933 births
2001 deaths
Sportspeople from Nalchik
Soviet footballers
Soviet Union international footballers
Soviet Top League players
FC Dynamo Moscow players
1958 FIFA World Cup players
Association football goalkeepers